The Diocese of Carlisle was created in 11 April 1132 by Henry I out of part of the Diocese of Durham, although many people of Cumbric descent in the area looked to Glasgow for spiritual leadership. The first bishop was Æthelwold, who was the king's confessor and became prior of the Augustinian priory at Nostell in Yorkshire. Carlisle was thus the only cathedral in England to be run by Augustinians instead of Benedictines. This only lasted until the reign of Henry III however, when the Augustinians in Carlisle joined the rebels who temporarily handed the city over to Scotland and elected their own bishop. When the revolt was ended, the Augustinians were expelled.

The seat of the diocese is the Cathedral Church of the Holy and Undivided Trinity in Carlisle.

The Diocese covers most of the non-metropolitan county of Cumbria; Alston Moor is part of the Diocese of Newcastle.  The diocese originally only covered the northern parts of Cumberland and Westmorland, and expanded to cover almost the entirety of these, as well as the Furness and Cartmel areas of Lancashire, in 1847, from part of the Diocese of Chester, although this did not take effect until 1856.

Organisation

Bishops
Alongside the diocesan Bishop of Carlisle (James Newcome), the Diocese has one suffragan bishop, the Bishop of Penrith (Rob Saner-Haigh).

There are five other retired bishops living in the diocese who are licensed as honorary assistant bishops:

1994–present: George Hacker, a former Bishop suffragan of Penrith, lives in Milburn.
1999–present: Hewlett Thompson, retired Bishop of Exeter, lives in Warcop.
2003–present: A retired Bishop suffragan of Bedford, John Richardson, is licensed in both Carlisle and Newcastle dioceses and lives in Bewcastle.
2011–present: Richard Henderson, a former Bishop of Tuam, Killala and Achonry (in Ireland) served as a Team Vicar in the Heart of Eden team ministry between 2011 and 2012.

Alternative episcopal oversight (for parishes in the diocese who reject the ministry of priests who are women) is provided by the provincial episcopal visitor (PEV) the Bishop suffragan of Beverley, Glyn Webster. Until his retirement on 19 July 2014, AEO was provided by John Goddard, Bishop suffragan of Burnley (from neighbouring Blackburn diocese), who was licensed as an honorary assistant bishop of the diocese in order to facilitate his work there.

Archdeaconries and deaneries
The diocese of Carlisle is divided into three archdeaconries, each divided into a number of rural deaneries. The data in this table is a summation of the statistics found in the list of churches.

*includes Cathedral

From 1889 to 1939, the diocese had one suffragan bishop, the Bishop of Barrow-in-Furness, and from 1939 until 1944, two suffragans bishops (Penrith and Barrow), before the see of Barrow went into the abeyance in which it remains to date.

List of churches

References

Sources
Church of England Statistics 2002 
Diocese of Carlisle
Carlisle Diocese Youth Centre (St John's-in-the-Vale)

 
1133 establishments in England
Carlisle, Cumbria
Dioceses established in the 12th century
Carlisle
Religious organizations established in the 1130s